Savah is an unincorporated community in Lynn Township, Posey County, in the U.S. state of Indiana.

History
A post office was established at Savah in 1892, and remained in operation until it was discontinued in 1902.

Geography

References

Unincorporated communities in Posey County, Indiana
Unincorporated communities in Indiana